Ostara is the title of the second album by The Wishing Tree, a project by Marillion's guitarist Steve Rothery and singer Hannah Stobart. The album was produced and engineered by Rothery and mixed by Michael Hunter, who also produced the two most recent Marillion albums. Hunter also contributed additional keyboards and percussion. The artwork is by Spanish artist Antonio Seijas, who had created the artwork for Marillion's Happiness is the Road (2008). Rothery's wife Jo and daughter Jennifer are credited for additional backing vocals and cover design, respectively. The drummer is Hannah's husband Paul Craddick (of Enchant).

Track listing
"Ostara" – 5:16
"Easy" – 5:26
"Hollow Hills" – 6:21
"Seventh Sign" – 5:43
"Falling" – 5:55
"Fly" – 4:41
"Kingfisher" – 4:16
"Soldier" – 5:36
Total time 43:14
All songs written by Steve Rothery/Hannah Stobart. All lyrics by Stobart.

Personnel
Hannah Stobart – Lead & Backing Vocals
Steve Rothery – Lead/Rhythm/Acoustic Guitars; Bass Guitars; Keyboards

With:

Paul Craddick - Drums
Mike Hunter - Additional keyboards & percussion
Jo Rothery - Additional backing vocals

External links
Ostara on marillion.com
Free download of "Hollow Hills" and further sound-clips on ReverbNation.com

2009 albums